Castle Qua (also known as Castle Quaw or Castle-dykes) is the name given to an earthwork found in the Cartland Craigs National Nature Reserve near Lanark, South Lanarkshire. It is site number NS84SE 1 in the records of the Royal Commission on the Ancient and Historical Monuments of Scotland. It's believed to be a medieval structure.

References

Lanark